Elisabeth Gyllenstierna (1581–1646) was a Swedish court official. She was the överhovmästarinna to Christina, Queen of Sweden, from 1634 until 1639.

She was the daughter of the riksdrots baron Nils Göransson Gyllenstierna af Lundholm and Ebba Bielke af Åkerö. In 1608, she married the admiral and riksråd nobleman Hans Claesson Bielkenstierna (d. 1620). She was appointed head lady in waiting in 1634. During her tenure, she is known to have made use of her position to recommend relatives to offices, and it is noted that she had her daughters Ebba and Karin and her niece Ebba Gyllenstierna to maids-of-honours.

References

 http://www.adelsvapen.com/genealogi/Gyllenstierna_af_Lundholm_nr_3
 Erik Petersson: Maktspelerskan : drottning Kristinas revolt (2011)
 Marie-Louise Rodén: Drottning Christina : en biografi (2008)
 Eva Österberg, red (1997). Jämmerdal & Fröjdesal. Kvinnor i stormaktstidens Sverige. Stockholm: Atlantis AB.

1581 births
1646 deaths
Mistresses of the Robes (Sweden)
People of the Swedish Empire
Court of Christina, Queen of Sweden
17th-century Swedish nobility